True is Mika Nakashima's first Japanese album. In contrast to the typical Japanese J-pop and Western pop artist, this album was one in which Mika established a sound that would become her trademark for future albums: a mature, adult contemporary-influenced mixture of smooth jazz and soft pop.

True topped the Oricon albums chart for three straight weeks, selling one million copies within that time span, and has since sold over 1,173,534 copies. It won Nakashima the Album of the Year Award at the 2003 Japan Gold Disc Awards.

Track listing

Charts and sales

Oricon sales charts (Japan)

Singles

References
 http://www.mikanakashima.com/

2002 debut albums
Mika Nakashima albums